is a Japanese manga series written and illustrated by Coffee. It has been serialized in Kodansha's Monthly Afternoon since January 2019, with its chapters collected in ten tankōbon volumes as of October 2022. In North America, the manga is licensed for English release by Kodansha USA.

Publication
Wandance is written and illustrated by Coffee. The series began in Kodansha's Monthly Afternoon on January 25, 2019. Kodansha has collected its chapters into individual tankōbon volumes. The first volume was released on May 23, 2019. As of February 21, 2023, ten volumes have been released.

Kodansha USA announced the English release of the manga in North America, with the first volume being released on June 28, 2022.

Volume list

Reception
In 2020, the manga was one of the 50 nominees for the 6th Next Manga Awards. It was one of the Jury Recommended Works at the 24th Japan Media Arts Festival in 2021.

References

Further reading

External links
  
 

Dance in anime and manga
Kodansha manga
School life in anime and manga
Seinen manga